Mohamed Nasef (born 1 November 1988), is an Egyptian footballer who plays for Egyptian Premier League side Tala'ea El Gaish, as a defender.

Honours

Club
Zamalek
Egypt Cup: 2015–16
Egyptian Super Cup: 2016

References

1988 births
Living people
People from Monufia Governorate
Egyptian footballers
Egypt international footballers
Association football defenders
Egyptian Premier League players
ENPPI SC players
Zamalek SC players
Tala'ea El Gaish SC players
Al Ittihad Alexandria Club players